Sony Vaio PCV Series is the first line of products of desktop computers introduced by Sony under their VAIO brand in 1996. The series would be introduced to the Japanese market the following year, with the introduction of the mini-tower computer, PCV-T700MR on July 15, 1997.

History 
After a long hiatus from building consumer PCs, Sony announced the re-entering into computer manufacturing market with the introduction the VAIO brand in 1996 while in Japan the following year. Sony's first lineup of VAIO desktop computers, the PCV-70 and PCV-90 would be introduced at the 1996 PC Expo Trade Show in New York. While in Japan, Sony introduced PCV-T700MR mini-tower computer, and two notebook computers for the Japanese market.

PCV Lineup 
The PCV series are broken into various sub-series variants, each focusing on specific consumers that fits their needs. Despite the variants introduced, the PCV series introduced 10 numbered models before adding a suffix to differentiate its future lineup. The letter(s)/suffix that starts before or after the model number indicates which sub-series it belongs to. The list below describes each suffix.

Sub-series Lineup 

The sub-series consists of 18 variants: 
 DS series (Digital Studio Series)
 E series (MicroTower series)
 HS series
 HX series
 J series
 JX series
 L series
 LX series
 M series
 MX series
 P series
 R series
 RX series
 RZ series
 S series
 T series
 V series
 W series

References 

PCV
Consumer electronics brands
Computer-related introductions in 1996
Japanese brands